AT5 (Amstel Television 5) is a local television station in Amsterdam, Netherlands.  It first broadcast on April 1, 1992.

The city of Amsterdam is a minority shareholder, and has provided financial support to the station.

See also 
 Media of the Netherlands
 Netherlands Public Broadcasting

References

External links 

 

1992 establishments in the Netherlands
Dutch-language television networks
Netherlands Public Broadcasting
Dutch public broadcasting organisations
Television channels in the Netherlands
Television channels and stations established in 1992
Mass media in Amsterdam